Juan Carlos Ruíz (born 14 August 1968) is a Bolivian footballer. He played in five matches for the Bolivia national football team from 1995 to 1996. He was also part of Bolivia's squad for the 1995 Copa América tournament.

References

External links
 

1968 births
Living people
Bolivian footballers
Bolivia international footballers
Association football defenders
Sportspeople from Santa Cruz de la Sierra